Elizaberth Chipeleme (born 4 August 1992) is a Zambian badminton player.

Career
In 2013, she represented University of Zambia compete at the Summer Universiade in Kazan, Russia. She was the runner-up at the 2015 Botswana International tournament in the women's doubles event teamed-up with Ngandwe Miyambo. They were defeated by Ogar Siamupangila and Grace Gabriel in the straight sets. The pair were runners-up at the 2016 Zambia International tournament, and semifinalists at the 2016 Botswana International. In the mixed doubles event, she was partnered with Topsy Phiri, and they were finalists at the 2016 Ethiopia International tournament. She was also the women's singles finalist at the Top 16 Badminton Championship in Lusaka. In the final, she was defeated by Ngandwe Miyambo in straight sets. Chipeleme was a part of the Zambian team to win bronze at the 2017 African Badminton Championships.

Achievements

BWF International Challenge/Series (3 runners-up)
Women's Doubles

Mixed Doubles

 BWF International Challenge tournament
 BWF International Series tournament
 BWF Future Series tournament

References

External links
 

1992 births
Living people
Zambian female badminton players
Badminton players at the 2022 Commonwealth Games
Commonwealth Games competitors for Zambia